Shimron - a biblical city in northern Israel.
 Shimron, son of Issachar
 Gad Shimron - Israeli journalist
 Shimron Hetmyer - West Indian cricketer , who also plays for Guyana in both the           
  Regional Super50
 for the Guyana Jaguars and the Caribbean Premier League for the Guyana Amazon Warriors.